Gazmeh-ye Marishan (also Romanized as Gazmeh-ye Mārīshān) is a village in Taftan-e Jonubi Rural District, Nukabad District, Khash County, Sistan and Baluchestan Province, Iran. According to the 2006 census, its population was 34, with ten families.

References 

Populated places in Khash County